The 2016–17 season are the Persepolis's 16th season in the Pro League, and their 34th consecutive season in the top division of Iranian Football. They were also be competing in the Hazfi Cup and AFC Champions League.

Key events

Squad

First team squad

Apps and goals updated as of 31 December 2015 
For more on the reserve and academy squads, see Persepolis Novin, Persepolis Academy, Persepolis Shomal & Persepolis Qaem Shahr.
Source: fc-perspolis.com, FFIRI.IR

Loan list

For recent transfers, see List of Iranian football transfers summer 2016 & List of Iranian football transfers winter 2016–17.
For more on the reserve and academy squads, see Persepolis Novin, Persepolis Academy, Persepolis Shomal & Persepolis Qaem Shahr.

New Contracts

Transfers

In

Out

Technical staff

|}

Competitions

Overview

Persian Gulf Pro League

Standings

Results summary

Results by round

Matches

Hazfi Cup

Matches

AFC Champions League

Group stage

Matches

Friendly Matches

Pre-season

During season

Club

Kit 

|
|
|
|

Sponsorship 

Main sponsor: Hamrah-e Avval
Official sponsor: Kosar Credit Cooperative
Official sponsor: Steel Azin Iranian Holding Co.
Official shirt manufacturer:Joma

Official water: Damavand Mineral Water Co.

See also
 2016–17 Iran Pro League
 2016–17 Hazfi Cup

References

External links
Iran Premier League Statistics
Persian League
Persepolis News

Persepolis F.C. seasons
Persepolis